Nosa Omoregie, professionally known as Nosa, is a Nigerian recording artist, singer, songwriter and performer. He is currently signed to Warner Music Group African partner, Chocolate City.

Early life 
Nosa Omoregie, known simple as Nosa, was born on 26 February 1981, he is a native of Benin City, Edo State.

Education 
Studied Engineering at the University of Benin (UNIBEN). Edo State

Career 
Nosa's source of joy as a growing child was in music and attending Church, where he began exploring his developing talents. He started out in the children's choir in church and is majorly influenced by gospel singers like Fred Hammond and Kim Burrell and the noted R n B group Boyz II men. He later got to love jazz and soul music and then rock, for the simplicity of it. He is also greatly influenced by Afro-Highlife particularly music from Sonny Okosun, Christy Essien-Igbokwe, King Sunny Adé and Onyeka Onwenu, thus venturing from a wide array of childhood career fantasies of becoming an engineer, military man, or footballer to becoming a music producer and singer.

Nosa's aim with his music is to create a bridge between music genres while making sure the gospel aspect of it is on a fore-front platform just as the other genres i.e. a unique merger of sorts: creatively superimposing a soul tune on a high-life beat, a high-life verse with a rock-y chorus or singing 'Pidgin' English with an R n B flavor while proclaiming an inspirational and uplifting message to his listeners.

His debut studio album, Open Doors, was released on 14 March 2014 and supported by the singles "Always Pray for You", "Why You Love Me" and  "Always on My Mind". And again In May 2014, he partnered with Nokia for the release of his song "Love is Calling". On 16 May 2014, The Punch Newspaper reported that Nosa signed an endorsement deal with Unilever. On the 26th of February 2020, which also happened to be his birthday, Nosa went on to float his own Record Label Salt Music.

Music career and breakthrough single
Nosa was signed to Chocolate City in 2012. On 11 November 2009 Nosa released his first single, "Always Pray for You", under the Chocolate City label. "Always Pray for You" is Nosa's first official single.

Discography

Albums
Open Doors (2013)

Singles

Awards and nominations

See also

 List of Nigerian musicians

See also
 List of Nigerian gospel musicians

References

External links 
 

Musicians from Benin City
1981 births
Living people
Nigerian songwriters
Nigerian gospel singers
21st-century Nigerian male singers
University of Benin (Nigeria) alumni